Pterolophia stheniodes is a species of beetle in the family Cerambycidae. It was described by Stephan von Breuning in 1938.

Subspecies
 Pterolophia stheniodes stheniodes Breuning, 1938
 Pterolophia stheniodes grossepunctipennis Breuning, 1969

References

stheniodes
Beetles described in 1938